The 1989 Scotland rugby union tour of Japan was a series of matches played in May 1989 in Japan by Scotland national rugby union team.

Results
Scores and results list Scotland's points tally first.

Notes

References

Scotland rugby union tour
Scotland national rugby union team tours
Rugby union tours of Japan
tour
tour